Arrernte Sign Language, or Aranda Sign Language, also known as Iltyeme-iltyeme (handsigns),  is a highly developed Australian Aboriginal sign language used by the Arrernte people of central Australia.

References

Bibliography
 Strehlow, Carl (1915). The sign language of the Aranda. (p. 349–370). (Extracted from Die Aranda-und-Loritja-Stamme in Zentral-Australien, Frankfurt: Baer; translated by C. Chewings. Reprinted (1978) in Aboriginal sign languages of the Americas and Australia New York: Plenum Press, vol. 2.)

Australian Aboriginal Sign Language family
Arandic languages